The Higher Education Evaluation and Accreditation Council of Taiwan (HEEACT) was founded in May 2005. HEEACT applied for ISO certification in July 2008 and received certification on 4 February 2009.

Until 2012, HEEACT published the annual Performance Ranking of Scientific Papers for World Universities, a bibliometrics based ranking of research universities. The performance measures were composed of eight indicators (11 years articles, Current articles, 11 years citations, Current citations, Average citations, H-index, Highly cited papers, and High Impact journal articles) representing three different criteria of scientific paper performance: research productivity, research impact, and research excellence. The objective indicators used in this ranking system were designed measure both long-term and short-term research performance of each university. The ranking started in 2007.

External links
 Website of HEEACT
Educational institutions established in 2005
2005 establishments in Taiwan
University and college rankings
Education in Taiwan